Harold Kenneth "H.K." Edgerton (born February 18, 1948) is an American neoconfederate activist, known for his advocacy of Southern heritage and the Confederate Flag. An African-American member of the Sons of Confederate Veterans,  Edgerton formerly served as President of the Asheville, North Carolina chapter of the National Association for the Advancement of Colored People (NAACP), and is currently on the board of the Southern Legal Resource Center.

Biography

Early life
Harold Kenneth "H.K." Edgerton was born in North Carolina on February 18, 1948, the son of Roger Roland Edgerton (1917-1994), a Protestant minister.

Career
Edgerton worked for improving racial issues through the Asheville chapter of the NAACP, where he was elected as president. Before becoming a president of NAACP, he had been an activist in support of Confederate heritage and had attended rallies supporting display of the Confederate flag. He was suspended from the NAACP in 1998 for non-compliance with the organization's rules after his Asheville branch fell into debt. He has been accused by some groups of "Neo-confederate revisionism", after meeting with Kirk Lyons, a lawyer who has taken to defending the neo-Confederate cause.

By 2000, Edgerton was appointed the chairman of the board of directors of the Southern Legal Resource Center, headed by Kirk Lyons, who has defended Confederates in court. In a 2000 interview, Skip Alston, Executive Director of the North Carolina NAACP had questions about Edgerton's stand. Alston said that he had been considered "a true activist standing for what is right. I've often wondered what could cause him to do such things."

In 2009, Edgerton threatened a lawsuit regarding newly elected Asheville City Council Member Cecil Bothwell, on the basis that Bothwell's atheism rendered him ineligible to serve in North Carolina public office.

In events to publicize his positions, Edgerton has made solo walks: in 2002 from North Carolina to Texas to build awareness of Southern heritage; and in January 2009, when he walked from North Carolina to Washington, DC seeking "official U.S. government recognition of the Confederate battle flag as a symbol of Southern heritage" from the new administration.  He is perceived by some as being heroic as an African-American member of the Sons of Confederate Veterans, which features him at events.

He has had a number of failed political campaigns for Asheville mayor and councilman.

In popular culture
In May 2006 Edgerton advanced his theories about reparations on Penn and Teller's show Bullshit!.

References

External links 
 SouthernHeritage411.com
 Asheville NAACP Requests Assistance, Southern Legal Resource Center

Activists for African-American civil rights
Living people
People from Asheville, North Carolina
1948 births
Activists from North Carolina
20th-century African-American people